Margareta (Maya) Ackerman is a Russian-American computer scientist known for her research in cluster analysis and algorithmic composition of music. She is an assistant professor of computer science and engineering at Santa Clara University, and the founder and CEO of algorithmic music firm WaveAI.

Early life and education
Ackerman was born in the Soviet Union. She moved with her family to Israel in 1990, when she was seven years old, and five years later moved again to Canada. She was a student of computer science at the University of Waterloo, earning a bachelor's degree in 2006, master's degree in 2007, and Ph.D. in 2012. Her dissertation, supervised by Shai Ben-David, was Towards Theoretical Foundations of Clustering.

Academic career
After postdoctoral research at the California Institute of Technology and the University of California, San Diego, Ackerman joined the faculty of Florida State University in 2014. She moved to San Jose State University in 2016, and to Santa Clara University in 2017.

Contributions
Ackerman is the co-creator of ALYSIA, an artificially intelligent system for creating pop music tunes. She founded the company WaveAI in 2017 to commercialize this technology.

She is also the author of a self-published book about her grandfather, a Polish-born holocaust survivor.

References

External links
Home page

Year of birth missing (living people)
Living people
Russian computer scientists
American women computer scientists
University of Waterloo alumni
Florida State University faculty
San Jose State University faculty
Santa Clara University faculty
American computer scientists
Russian women computer scientists
21st-century American scientists
21st-century American women scientists
American women academics